The Gurara II Power Station is a proposed 360 megawatts hydroelectric power station across the Gurara River in Nigeria. The power station is owned and is under development by the Federal Government of Nigeria. The Exim Bank of China has agreed to lend US$1 billion towards the construction of this renewable energy project. The Nigerian Federal Executive Council accepted that offer in May 2019.

The power station is separate from the 30 MW Gurara I Hydroelectric Power Station that crosses the same river and was under development by a concessionaire, as of May 2021.

Location
The power station would lie across the Gurara River, downstream of the 30 megawatts Gurara I Hydroelectric Power Station. This is near the settlement of Kagarko, in Kaduna State, in northern Nigeria.

Overview
The design calls for generation capacity of 360 MW. The dam and power station will be built in one phase. When completed, the power station is expected to supply 1,130 GWh of clean renewable energy to the Nigerian grid, annually.

Ownership
As of December 2021, this power station was owned by the Nigerian Federal Ministry of Water Resources.

Construction costs and funding
It has been reported that construction of this power station is expected to cost US$1.240 billion. The table below illustrates the expected sources of funding for the construction of the project.

Completion date
Groundbreaking is expected in 2023 and commercial commissioning is anticipated in 2026.

See also

 List of power stations in Nigeria

References

External links
 Federal Government Signs 30MW Gurara Concession Agreement With North South Power Company Limited As of 12 May 2020.

Kaduna State
Hydroelectric power stations in Nigeria
Proposed renewable energy power stations in Nigeria